Neureni Lake also known as Niureni Lake and Nyureni Lake is a freshwater lake located in the Lekhnath municipality of Kaski, Nepal. It has also been listed under the Ramsar convention along with the lakes Phewa, Begnas, Rupa, Dipang, Maidi, Khaste, Kamaltal and Gude lakes.

References

Lakes of Gandaki Province
Kaski District